Minatitlán is a city in southeastern Mexican state of Veracruz  in the Olmec  region of the state and the north of the Isthmus of Tehuantepec.

In 2010 the greater metropolitan area had a population of 356,020.

Much of the city sits on reclaimed wetlands, and many new homes built on this reclaimed land have a tendency to sink up to several meters before settling. Much of the surrounding undeveloped land is marshy, especially towards the northeast direction of Coatzacoalcos.

Minatitlán is home to the Refinería Gral. Lázaro Cárdenas del Río (now named for President Lázaro Cárdenas) a 1906 oil refinery that was the first such facility built in Latin America.  The refinery underwent an expansion that started in 2003 to bring the capacity of the plant up to 240,000 barrels per day, up from its previous capacity of 185,000 barrels per day.

It is a sister city of Minatitlán, Colima in the state of Colima, on the other side of the country.
The local economy is largely dependent on the oil industry and trade.

The Feria del Café y Minería (Coffee and Mining Fair) is held each year in January.

Transportation 

Minatitlán/Coatzacoalcos National Airport, located in Cosoleacaque, serves Minatitlán. Mexican Federal Highways 145D, 150, 172, 185 pass through Minatitlán. A cable stayed bridge known as Puente Coatza II or Puente Antonio Dovalí Jaime was built to carry Highway 150 over the Coatzacoalcos River. It was constructed starting in 1979 and was opened by president Miguel de la Madrid Hurtado on 17 October 1984.

Sports 
The Petroleros de Minatitlán (Minatitlán Oilers) play baseball in the Mexican League.  The Gavilanes de Minatitlán (Minatitlán Hawks) play in the Veracruz Winter League. Both teams' homefield is the Parque 18 de marzo de 1938.

Notable people 
 Actress Blanca Estela Pavón was born in Minatitlán in 1926.
 Artist Francisco Toledo attended school in Minatitlán in the 1940s.

Climate

References

External links

 Lomas de Tacojalpa Archaeological Site
 International Airport Minatitlán
 Minatitlán municipal government website
 Veracruz los Municipios de México

Populated places in Veracruz
Populated places established in 1826
1826 establishments in Mexico
Populated coastal places in Mexico